Corynephorus is a genus of European, North African, and Middle Eastern plants in the grass family.

Species

Corynephorus canescens (L.) P.Beauv. - Europe (from Portugal to Norway to Russia), Morocco
Corynephorus deschampsioides Bornm. - Syria, Israel, Jordan, Palestine
Corynephorus divaricatus (Pourr.) Breistr. - Mediterranean and nearby regions from Spain + Morocco to Iran
Corynephorus fasciculatus Boiss. & Reut. - Portugal, Spain, France incl Corsica, Sardinia, Sicily, Algeria
Corynephorus macrantherus Boiss. & Reut. - Portugal, Spain, Morocco, Algeria, Tunisia

References

Pooideae
Grasses of Africa
Grasses of Asia
Grasses of Europe
Taxa named by Palisot de Beauvois
Poaceae genera